USS Anacostia is a name used more than once by the U.S. Navy, after the Anacostia River:

 , was a tugboat and patrol boat during the Civil War.
 , was an oiler commissioned on 25 February 1945.

References 
 

United States Navy ship names